Culla is a municipality in the comarca of Alt Maestrat, Castellón, Valencia, Spain.

The town is located on a 1,121 m high mountain, right to the SE of the town rises the 1,090 m high Tossal de la Serrà and further away the 1,087 m high Esparreguera, the tallest summit of the Serra d'Esparreguera. Nearby Montlleó River hides canyons only accessible from Culla.

Culla has a population of 633 inhabitants.

History 
The castle of the town was one of the main castles of the historical Maestrat area in ancient times.

Villages 
 Culla
 Paulo 	
 Sales de Matella
 Mel o Pla de La Torreta
 Riu Sec
 Molinell
 Monllat
 Pla del Sabater

References

External links 

 Culla, ratllant el cel - Culla Town Hall 
 Culla - Turismo de Castellon
 Paco González Ramírez - País Valencià, poble a poble, comarca a comarca
 Institut Valencià d'Estadística.
 Portal de la Direcció General d'Administració Local de la Generalitat

Municipalities in the Province of Castellón
Alt Maestrat
Maestrazgo